Daniils Bobrovs (born 8 October 1997) is a Latvian swimmer. He competed in the men's 100 metre breaststroke event at the 2017 World Aquatics Championships. In 2019, he represented Latvia at the 2019 World Aquatics Championships held in Gwangju, South Korea.

References

External links
 

1997 births
Living people
Latvian male breaststroke swimmers
Place of birth missing (living people)
Swimmers at the 2015 European Games
European Games competitors for Latvia
Olympic swimmers of Latvia
Swimmers at the 2020 Summer Olympics
Competitors at the 2017 Summer Universiade